This is an alphabetized glossary of terms pertaining to lighting fires, along with their definitions. Firelighting (also called firestarting, fire making, or fire craft) is the process of starting a fire artificially. Fire was an essential tool in early human cultural development. The ignition of any fire, whether natural or artificial, requires completing the fire triangle, usually by initiating the combustion of a suitably flammable material.

A

B

C

D

E

F

G

L

M

N

P

R

S

T

V

W

Z

References

External links
 Home Improvement Tool

 

 
Firelighting
Wikipedia glossaries using description lists